Kabelo Kgosiemang (born 7 January 1986) is a high jumper from Botswana. He has won the high jump at the African Championships in Athletics on five consecutive occasions. His personal best, also the current national record of Botswana, was set in winning the 2008 African Championships in Athletics.

International competitions

See also
 Sport in Botswana

References

External links
 

1986 births
Living people
Botswana male high jumpers
Olympic athletes of Botswana
Athletes (track and field) at the 2008 Summer Olympics
Commonwealth Games bronze medallists for Botswana
Commonwealth Games medallists in athletics
Athletes (track and field) at the 2010 Commonwealth Games
Athletes (track and field) at the 2014 Commonwealth Games
World Athletics Championships athletes for Botswana
African Games gold medalists for Botswana
African Games medalists in athletics (track and field)
African Games silver medalists for Botswana
Athletes (track and field) at the 2007 All-Africa Games
Athletes (track and field) at the 2011 All-Africa Games
Athletes (track and field) at the 2015 African Games
Medallists at the 2010 Commonwealth Games